The 2014 Iowa State Cyclones football team represented Iowa State University in the 2014 NCAA Division I FBS football season. Playing as a member of the Big 12 Conference (Big 12), the team was led by head coach Paul Rhoads, in his sixth year and played its home games at Jack Trice Stadium in Ames, Iowa. They finished the season 2–10, 0–9 in Big 12 play to finish in last place.

Personnel

Coaching staff

Schedule

Schedule Source:

Game summaries

Game 1: vs. North Dakota State Bison

Game 2: vs. Kansas State Wildcats

Kansas State won its first game and entered the game with a record of 1–0, while Iowa State had just came off a loss against North Dakota State.  Prior to the game, Iowa State has lost 32 of its last 36 games against ranked opponents while Kansas State had won the last six meetings overall after last season's 41-7 win.  When ranked, the Wildcats have defeated the Cyclones in 10 straight dating to 1994.

The game began with Kansas State taking an early lead 13–0 in the first quarter, but Iowa State scored a touchdown before the quarter concluded.  That Iowa State touchdown was the first of four consecutive for the cyclones which led them in with a 28–20 lead at halftime.  Neither team scored in the third period and Kansas State's defense continued the fourth quarter to prevent any score, allowing the Kansas State offense to produce two more touchdowns and a Wildcat victory 32–28.  The comeback-from-behind victory was considered "defining" for Kansas State.

During the game, Kansas State wide receiver Tyler Lockett caught a pass near the goal line on the sidelines.  In this play, it appeared that his knee appeared touched a pylon.  That event would by rule negate the catch. The Wildcats scored a touchdown on the next play, which prevented any additional video review.  The Big 12 replay official and communicator were given a one-game suspension for failing to follow protocol.

Game 3: at Iowa Hawkeyes

Game 4: vs. Baylor Bears

Game 5: at Oklahoma State Cowboys

Game 6: vs. Toledo Rockets

Game 7: at Texas Longhorns

Game 8: vs. Oklahoma Sooners

Game 9: at Kansas Jayhawks

Game 10: vs. Texas Tech Red Raiders

Game 11: vs. West Virginia Mountaineers

Game 12: at TCU Horned Frogs

References

Iowa State
Iowa State Cyclones football seasons
Iowa State Cyclones football